Saint Charles Township is one of twelve townships in Floyd County, Iowa, USA.  As of the 2000 census, its population was 1,346.

Geography
According to the United States Census Bureau, Saint Charles Township covers an area of 63.92 square miles (165.56 square kilometers); of this, 63.87 square miles (165.43 square kilometers, 99.92 percent) is land and 0.05 square miles (0.13 square kilometers, 0.08 percent) is water.

Cities, towns, villages
The city of Charles City is entirely within this township geographically but is a separate entity.

Adjacent townships
 Deerfield Township, Chickasaw County (northeast)
 Niles Township (northeast)
 Chickasaw Township, Chickasaw County (east)
 Riverton Township (southeast)
 Pleasant Grove Township (southwest)
 Union Township (southwest)
 Ulster Township (west)
 Floyd Township (northwest)

Major highways
  U.S. Route 18
  U.S. Route 218
  Iowa Highway 14

Landmarks
 Charles City Municipal Airport

School districts
 Charles City Community School District

Political districts
 Iowa's 4th congressional district
 State House District 14
 State Senate District 7

References
 United States Census Bureau 2008 TIGER/Line Shapefiles
 United States Board on Geographic Names (GNIS)
 United States National Atlas

External links
 US-Counties.com
 City-Data.com

Townships in Floyd County, Iowa
Townships in Iowa